The English National Cup is an annual basketball knock-out competition held between professional, semi-professional and amateur teams from the various divisions of the National Basketball League.  For most of the competition's history, the draw has featured the elite of English basketball, but teams from the British Basketball League currently do not compete in the National Cup, as they compete in their own separate competition, the BBL Cup.

The final is usually played midway through the season, at a neutral venue. The winners of the tournament are awarded the George Williams Trophy, which is named for the man who donated the original cup.

History

The competition was originally launched as the A.B.B.A. National Championship in 1936, and was the first attempt by the Amateur Basketball Ball Association (A.B.B.A.) to develop an annual national basketball championship in England and Wales. The National Championship was initially structured as an end-of-season event to allow regional champions to compete against their peers from across England and Wales. It was governed by the Amateur Basket Ball Association (A.B.B.A.), a forerunner of the current Basketball England organisation.  During World War II, the competition was put on hiatus; the last pre-war winners, Birmingham Athletic Institute, retained the trophy for the duration of the hostilities.

Following the introduction of the National Basketball League (NBL) in 1972, the cup began a gradual decline in its influence on the English game as alternative national competitions became more established. The introduction of the NBL's own end-of-season playoffs in 1979 resulted in the competition being restructured into a season-long knockout tournament similar to football's FA Cup, with the competition renamed the National Cup to avoid confusion with the league championship. This structure continued through the introduction of the independent, franchise-based British Basketball League in 1987, though the cup was eventually truncated to a 16-team event for 1998 onwards, with the clubs holding a BBL franchise being joined by the top teams from the previous year's NBL Division 1 standings. This change in format came at the same time as the BBC began showing live coverage of the semi-finals and final.

In 2003, the governance and competition structure of basketball in England underwent a period of reinvention, which included rebranding the NBL as the English Basketball League and introducing new rules governing the use of import players across all Basketball England competitions. These changes led to conflict with the British Basketball League, which withdrew the support of all top-flight clubs and started their own breakaway competition. The withdrawal of the top-flight clubs led to the National Cup returning to a more open structure, with teams able to enter from all divisions of the NBL. This format largely remains to this day, with small variations in organisation during the early rounds.

Format

The current competition structure is a knockout tournament with pairings drawn completely at random – there are no seeds, with the draw for all the rounds up to and including the quarter-final taking place in May.  

When there are an uneven number of clubs in the draw, some pre-selected teams will receive byes into the next round.  In some seasons the number of entries has required a preliminary round.

Past winners

References

Basketball competitions in England
Basketball cup competitions in the United Kingdom
English Basketball League
Basketball cup competitions in Europe